Farish-Lambeth House is a historic home located near Sanford, Lee County, North Carolina. It was built in 1852, and is a two-story, four bay, Greek Revival style frame dwelling.  It is sheathed in weatherboard, sits on a brick foundation, has exterior gable-end brick chimneys, and a one-story hip-roofed front porch. Also on the property is a contributing chicken house (1930s).

It was listed on the National Register of Historic Places in 2002.

References

Houses on the National Register of Historic Places in North Carolina
Greek Revival houses in North Carolina
Houses completed in 1852
Houses in Lee County, North Carolina
National Register of Historic Places in Lee County, North Carolina
1852 establishments in North Carolina